Fané is a surname. Notable people with the surname include:
Lassana Fané (born 1987), Malian footballer
Ousmane Fané (born 1993), French footballer

See also 
Fane (disambiguation)